The spotted scrubwren (Sericornis maculatus) is a bird species native to coastal southern Australia, from  Adelaide westwards to Shark Bay in Western Australia. It was formerly considered conspecific with the white-browed scrubwren, and is known to hybridize with that species where their ranges overlap in the Adelaide area. Genetic analysis in a 2018 study of the family found that this taxon was more divergent from the white-browed scrubwren than the Tasmanian or Atherton scrubwrens and hence proposed its reclassification as a species. It was reclassified as a species in 2019.

Taxonomy
Sericornis maculatus includes the following subspecies:
 S. m. ashbyi - Mathews, 1912
 S. m. mellori - Mathews, 1912
 S. m. maculatus - Gould, 1847
 S. m. balstoni - Ogilvie-Grant, 1909

References 

Sericornis
Birds of Western Australia
Birds described in 1847
Birds of South Australia